La-Celle-Dunoise is a commune in the Creuse department in the Nouvelle-Aquitaine region in central France.

Geography

History
La Celle-Dunoise has Gallo-Roman origins, as shown by various relics discovered within the territory of the commune.

In 1154, a document mentions the name of Ecclesia Cella, which by 1339 had  become Ecclesia de Cella dunensi, giving the name of the village today.
A castle was built here in the 12th century but It was destroyed in 1500. It belonged to the family of La Celle, one of the most powerful families of La Marche in the Middle Ages.

Population

Sights
 The church of St. Pierre, dating from the twelfth century.
 The bridge, dating from the fourteenth century.

See also
Communes of the Creuse department

References

External links

 Official commune website 
  Website of the tourist office of the pays des 3 lacs 

Communes of Creuse